Matilda Jungstedt (13 October 1864 –1923) was a Swedish opera singer. She was born in Norrköping as the daughter of Johan Nils Jungstedt and Matilda Sundius, and was sister of painter Axel Jungstedt. She was active at the Royal Swedish Opera in Stockholm from 1888.

References

Further reading

1864 births
1923 deaths
People from Norrköping
19th-century Swedish women opera singers
20th-century Swedish women opera singers